Stefano Ticozzi (1762-1836) was an Italian art historian.

He was born in Pasturo, near Como, he wrote the three volumes published in Milan during 1830-1833 of the encyclopedic Dizionario degli architetti, scultori, pittori, intagliatori in rame ed in pietra, coniatori di medaglie, musaicisti, niellatori, intarsiatori d'ogni età e d'ogni nazione (Dictionary of the architects, sculptors, painters, engravers in wood and stone, minters of medallions, mosaicists, jewelers of niello, and makers of intarsio work). The work was a then up-to-date assembly of biographical data and works of artists from Europe of the prior four centuries to the contemporary time, who were known to the author through exposure or the work of previous authors.

Ticozzi was an honorary member of the Accademia Carrara and the Atheneum of Venice. Ticozzi also published Giovanni Battista Armenini's sixteenth century treatise on painting: De veri precetti della pittura.

Catalogue of monograms
Among the artists for which Ticozzi graphically reproduces the monograms are the following:

References
Dictionary of Art Historians

1762 births
1836 deaths
People from Como
Italian art historians
Artist authors
Biographers of artists